Beregovoy is a rural locality (a settlement) in Sultanovsky Selsoviet of Volodarsky District, Astrakhan Oblast, Russia. The population was 163 as of 2010. There is 1 street.

Geography 
Beregovoy is located 37 km southwest of Volodarsky (the district's administrative centre) by road. Nizhnyaya Sultanovka is the nearest rural locality.

References 

Rural localities in Volodarsky District, Astrakhan Oblast